The Riverside Mountains are a mountain range in Riverside County, California. The town of Vidal, California is located in the West Riverside Mountains.

Geography
The Riverside Mountains are in the Colorado Desert, in the Lower Colorado River Valley region. They are southeast of the Turtle Mountains and north of the Big Maria Mountains, and the Colorado River borders its eastern perimeter.

Riverside Mountains Wilderness
The Riverside Mountains Wilderness was established in 1994 and is managed by the Bureau of Land Management. The Colorado River parallels this 24,004 acre wilderness on its eastern edge.

The landscape varies from gently sloping bajadas to steep, rugged interiors. Washes emerging from canyons divide the bajadas below. Numerous peaks in the Riverside Mountains give this small range a rough, craggy appearance. Two sensitive plant species, the foxtail cactus and California barrel cactus; and a small herd of Burro deer (Odocoileus hemionus eremicus) live in the Riverside range.

Geology

Maria Fold and Thrust Belt 
The Riverside Mountains are one of several ranges that constitute the Maria Fold and Thrust Belt (MFTB). The Maria Fold and Thrust Belt underwent generally thick-skinned (involving basement rocks) north–south-trending crustal shortening in the Cretaceous. The structures of the MFTB are exposed by to later generally east–west-trending large-scale crustal extension in the Miocene, through what is known to geologists as the Colorado River Extensional Corridor. This north–south shortening is anomalous, as crustal shortening in the rest of the North American Cordillera is oriented generally east–west because of the generally east–west compression that was due to the subduction of the Farallon plate under western North America. Also unlike the rest of the North American Cordillera, deformation in the Maria Fold and Thrust Belt involved rocks of the North American Craton, most notably the Grand Canyon sequence of sedimentary rocks.

Rocks 
The Riverside Mountains contain rocks from both the lower and upper plates of a large detachment fault and metamorphic core complex system as a result of the Miocene-age extension. The lower plate consists of a stack of metamorphosed units, which comprise Jurassic metavolcanics, the metamorphosed Grand Canyon sequence, the metamorphosed McCoy Mountains Formation and related Mesozoic rocks, and the Precambrian basement. The upper plate of the detachment fault consists of a small sedimentary basin containing Tertiary-age syntectonic (deposited during tectonic activity) volcanic units, conglomerates, and other sedimentary rocks.

See also
West Riverside Mountains
:Category:Flora of the California desert regions
:Category:Protected areas of the Colorado Desert
:Category:Wilderness areas within the Lower Colorado River Valley
:Category:Bureau of Land Management areas in California

References

External links

Riverside Mountains Wilderness - Wilderness Connect
Rice Solar website, w/ regional map; Shaded Relief map: Whipple, Turtle, Big Maria, and Riverside Mountains

Mountain ranges of the Colorado Desert
Protected areas of the Colorado Desert
Mountain ranges of Riverside County, California
Mountain ranges of the Lower Colorado River Valley
Wilderness areas within the Lower Colorado River Valley
Bureau of Land Management areas in California
Protected areas of Riverside County, California